This article contains a list of episodes of the Dutch TV series De Club van Sinterklaas. Episodes were first aired by Fox Kids (1999, 2001-2004), Jetix (2005-2008) and RTL 4 (2009). The series has also spun a theatrical series.

Season 1: De Club van Sinterklaas (1999)

Season 2: De Nieuwe Club van Sinterklaas (2001)

Season 3: De Club van Sinterklaas & de Verdwijning van Wagen 27 (2002)
d

Season 4: De Club van Sinterklaas & het Blafpoeder (2003)

Season 7: De Club van Sinterklaas & Paniek in de Confettifabriek (2006)

References

Lists of children's television series episodes
Sinterklaas